Stadtsteinach is a town in the district of Kulmbach, in Bavaria, Germany. It is situated in the Frankenwald, 8 km northeast of Kulmbach.

It is known for its proximity to mountains, fields and nature reserves.

Town divisions

Stadtsteinach is arranged in the following boroughs:

Sons and daughters of the town
 Karl Burkart (1798–1851), German administrative lawyer
 Friedrich Baur, founder of Baur Versand, established 1925 in Altenkunstadt, a division of Burgkunstadt. Baur Versand had been one of the pioneers of mail order, later online business and is part of the Otto Group since 1997. 
 Michael Schnabrich (1880–1939), German politician (SPD) and Reichstag deputy of Weimar Republic (voting against the Enabling Act of Adolf Hitler)

 Wilhelm Weiss (1892-1950), politician (NSDAP), SA-Obergruppenführer and chief editor of the Völkischer Beobachter
 Jörg Dittwar (born 1963), football player
 Simone Mathes (born 1975), hammer thrower, several times German champion during the 1990s

References

Kulmbach (district)